D. costata may refer to:

Dacryodes costata, a tree species
Diaphania costata, a moth species
Diastata costata, a fly species